Transcranial magnetic stimulation (TMS) is a noninvasive form of brain stimulation in which a changing magnetic field is used to induce an electric current at a specific area of the brain through electromagnetic induction. An electric pulse generator, or stimulator, is connected to a magnetic coil connected to the scalp. The stimulator generates a changing electric current within the coil which creates a varying magnetic field, inducing a current within a region in the brain itself.

TMS has shown diagnostic and therapeutic potential in the central nervous system with a wide variety of disease states in neurology and mental health, with research still evolving.

Adverse effects of TMS appear rare and include fainting and seizure. Other potential issues include discomfort, pain, hypomania, cognitive change, hearing loss, and inadvertent current induction in implanted devices such as pacemakers or defibrillators. A number of reports detail other significant adverse experiences, such as new seizures, psychotic symptoms, and other effects.

Medical uses 

TMS does not require surgery or electrode implantation. Its use can be divided into diagnostic and therapeutic applications. Effects vary based on frequency and intensity of the magnetic pulses as well as the length of treatment, which dictates the total number of pulses given. TMS treatments are approved by the FDA in the US and by NICE in the UK for the treatment of depression and are predominantly provided by private clinics. TMS stimulates cortical tissue without the pain sensations produced in transcranial electrical stimulation.

Diagnosis 
TMS can be used clinically to measure activity and function of specific brain circuits in humans, most commonly with single or paired magnetic pulses. The most widely accepted use is in measuring the connection between the primary motor cortex of the central nervous system and the peripheral nervous system to evaluate damage related to past or progressive neurologic insult.

Treatment 
Repetitive high frequency TMS (rTMS) has shown diagnostic and therapeutic potential with the central nervous system in a variety of disease states, particularly in the fields of neurology and mental health.

Adverse effects 
Although TMS is generally regarded as safe, risks are increased for therapeutic rTMS compared to single or paired diagnostic TMS. Adverse effects generally increase with higher frequency stimulation.

The greatest immediate risk from TMS is fainting, though this is uncommon. Seizures have been reported, but are rare. Other adverse effects include short term discomfort, pain, brief episodes of hypomania, cognitive change, hearing loss, impaired working memory, and the induction of electrical currents in implanted devices such as cardiac pacemakers.

Procedure
During the procedure, a magnetic coil is positioned at the head of the person receiving the treatment using anatomical landmarks on the skull, in particular the inion and nasion. The coil is then connected to a pulse generator, or stimulator, that delivers electric current to the coil.

Physics 

TMS uses electromagnetic induction to generate an electric current across the scalp and skull. A plastic-enclosed coil of wire is held next to the skull and when activated, produces a varying magnetic field oriented orthogonally to the plane of the coil. The changing magnetic field then induces an electric current in the brain that activates nearby nerve cells in a manner similar to a current applied superficially at the cortical surface.

The magnetic field is about the same strength as Magnetic resonance imaging (MRI), and the pulse generally reaches no more than 5 centimeters into the brain unless using a modified coil and technique for deeper stimulation.

Transcranial magnetic stimulation is achieved by quickly discharging current from a large capacitor into a coil to produce pulsed magnetic fields between 2 and 3 Tesla in strength. Directing the magnetic field pulse at a targeted area in the brain causes a localized electrical current which can then either depolarize or hyperpolarize neurons at that site. 
The induced electric field inside the brain tissue causes a change in transmembrane potentials resulting in depolarization or hyperpolarization of neurons, causing them to be more or less excitable, respectively.

Deep TMS can reach up to 6 cm into the brain to stimulate deeper layers of the motor cortex, such as that which controls leg motion. The path of this current can be difficult to model because the brain is irregularly shaped with variable internal density and water content, leading to a nonuniform magnetic field strength and conduction throughout its tissues.

Frequency and duration
The effects of TMS can be divided based on frequency, duration and intensity (amplitude) of stimulation:
 Single or paired pulse TMS causes neurons in the neocortex under the site of stimulation to depolarize and discharge an action potential. If used in the primary motor cortex, it produces muscle activity referred to as a motor evoked potential (MEP) which can be recorded on electromyography. If used on the occipital cortex, 'phosphenes' (flashes of light) might be perceived by the subject. In most other areas of the cortex, there is no conscious effect, but behaviour may be altered (e.g., slower reaction time on a cognitive task), or changes in brain activity may be detected using diagnostic equipment.
 Repetitive TMS produces longer-lasting effects which persist past the period of stimulation. rTMS can increase or decrease the excitability of the corticospinal tract depending on the intensity of stimulation, coil orientation, and frequency. Low frequency rTMS with a stimulus frequency less than 1 Hz is believed to inhibit cortical firing while a stimulus frequency greater than 1 Hz, or high frequency, is believed to provoke it.  Though its mechanism is not clear, it has been suggested as being due to a change in synaptic efficacy related to long-term potentiation (LTP) and long-term depression (LTD).

Coil types 
Most devices use a coil shaped like a figure-eight to deliver a shallow magnetic field that affects more superficial neurons in the brain. Differences in magnetic coil design are considered when comparing results, with important elements including the type of material, geometry and specific characteristics of the associated magnetic pulse.

The core material may be either a magnetically inert substrate ('air core'), or a solid, ferromagnetically active material ('solid core').  Solid cores result in more efficient transfer of electrical energy to a magnetic field and reduce energy loss to heat, and so can be operated with the higher volume of therapy protocols without interruption due to overheating.  Varying the geometric shape of the coil itself can cause variations in focality, shape, and depth of penetration.  Differences in coil material and its power supply also affect magnetic pulse width and duration.

A number of different types of coils exist, each of which produce different magnetic fields. The round coil is the original used in TMS. Later, the figure-eight (butterfly) coil was developed to provide a more focal pattern of activation in the brain, and the four-leaf coil for focal stimulation of peripheral nerves. The double-cone coil conforms more to the shape of the head. The Hesed (H-core), circular crown and double cone coils allow more widespread activation and a deeper magnetic penetration. They are supposed to impact deeper areas in the motor cortex and cerebellum controlling the legs and pelvic floor, for example, though the increased depth comes at the cost of a less focused magnetic pulse.

History 
Luigi Galvani (1737–1798) undertook research on the effects of electricity on the body in the late-eighteenth century and laid the foundations for the field of electrophysiology. In the 1830s Michael Faraday (1791–1867) discovered that an electrical current had a corresponding magnetic field, and that changing one could induce its counterpart.

Work to directly stimulate the human brain with electricity started in the late 1800s, and by the 1930s the Italian physicians Cerletti and Bini had developed electroconvulsive therapy (ECT). ECT became widely used to treat mental illness, and ultimately overused, as it began to be seen as a panacea. This led to a backlash in the 1970s.

In 1980 Merton and Morton successfully used transcranial electrical stimulation (TES) to stimulate the motor cortex. However, this process was very uncomfortable, and subsequently Anthony T. Barker began to search for an alternative to TES. He began exploring the use of magnetic fields to alter electrical signaling within the brain, and the first stable TMS devices were developed in 1985. They were originally intended as diagnostic and research devices, with evaluation of their therapeutic potential being a later development.  The United States' FDA first approved TMS devices in October 2008.

Research 
TMS has shown potential therapeutic effect on neurologic conditions such as Alzheimer's disease, amyotrophic lateral sclerosis, persistent vegetative states, epilepsy, stroke related disability, tinnitus, multiple sclerosis, schizophrenia, and traumatic brain injury.

With Parkinson's disease, early results suggest that low frequency stimulation may have an effect on medication associated dyskinesia, and that high frequency stimulation improves motor function. The most effective treatment protocols appear to involve high frequency stimulation of the motor cortex, particularly on the dominant side, but with more variable results for treatment of the dorsolateral prefrontal cortex. It is less effective than electroconvulsive therapy for motor symptoms, though both appear to have utility. Cerebellar stimulation has also shown potential for the treatment of levodopa associated dyskinesia.

In psychiatry, it has shown potential with anxiety disorders, including panic disorder and obsessive–compulsive disorder (OCD).  The most promising areas to target for OCD appear to be the orbitofrontal cortex and the supplementary motor area.  Older protocols that targeted the prefrontal dorsal cortex were less successful. It has also been studied with autism, substance abuse, addiction, and post-traumatic stress disorder (PTSD). For treatment-resistant major depressive disorder, high-frequency (HF) rTMS of the left dorsolateral prefrontal cortex (DLPFC) appears effective and low-frequency (LF) rTMS of the right DLPFC has probable efficacy. Research on the efficacy of rTMS in non-treatment-resistant depression is limited.

TMS can also be used to map functional connectivity between the cerebellum and other areas of the brain.

Study blinding 
Mimicking the physical discomfort of rTMS with placebo to discern its true effect is a challenging issue in research. It is difficult to establish a convincing placebo for TMS during controlled trials in conscious individuals due to the neck pain, headache and twitching in the scalp or upper face associated with the intervention. In addition, placebo manipulations can affect brain sugar metabolism and MEPs, which may confound results. This problem is exacerbated when using subjective measures of improvement.  Placebo responses in trials of rTMS in major depression are negatively associated with refractoriness to treatment.

A 2011 review found that most studies did not report unblinding. In the minority that did, participants in real and sham rTMS groups were not significantly different in their ability to correctly guess their therapy, though there was a trend for participants in the real group to more often guess correctly.

Animal model limitations 
TMS research in animal studies is limited due to its early US Food and Drug Administration approval for treatment-resistant depression, limiting development of animal specific magnetic coils.

Treatments for the general public

Regulatory approvals

Neurosurgery planning
Nexstim obtained United States Federal Food, Drug, and Cosmetic Act§Section 510(k) clearance for the assessment of the primary motor cortex for pre-procedural planning in December 2009 and for neurosurgical planning in June 2011.

Depression
The National Institutes of Health estimates depression medications work for only 60 percent to 70 percent of people who take them. It is approved as a Class II medical device under the "de novo pathway". In addition, the World Health Organization reports that the number of people living with depression has increased nearly 20 percent since 2005. In a 2012 study, TMS was found to improve depression significantly in 58 percent of patients and provide complete remission of symptoms in 37 percent of patients.

Other neurological areas
In the European Economic Area, various versions of Deep TMS H-coils have CE marking for Alzheimer's disease, autism, bipolar disorder, epilepsy, chronic pain, major depressive disorder, Parkinson's disease, post-traumatic stress disorder (PTSD), schizophrenia (negative symptoms) and to aid smoking cessation. One review found tentative benefit for cognitive enhancement in healthy people.

In August 2018, the US Food and Drug Administration authorized the use of TMS in the treatment of obsessive–compulsive disorder (OCD).

Coverage by health services and insurers

United Kingdom 
The United Kingdom's National Institute for Health and Care Excellence (NICE) issues guidance to the National Health Service (NHS) in England, Wales, Scotland and Northern Ireland (UK). NICE guidance does not cover whether or not the NHS should fund a procedure. Local NHS bodies (primary care trusts and hospital trusts) make decisions about funding after considering the clinical effectiveness of the procedure and whether the procedure represents value for money for the NHS.

NICE evaluated TMS for severe depression (IPG 242) in 2007, and subsequently considered TMS for reassessment in January 2011 but did not change its evaluation. The Institute found that TMS is safe, but there is insufficient evidence for its efficacy.

In January 2014, NICE reported the results of an evaluation of TMS for treating and preventing migraine (IPG 477).  NICE found that short-term TMS is safe but there is insufficient evidence to evaluate safety for long-term and frequent uses.  It found that evidence on the efficacy of TMS for the treatment of migraine is limited in quantity, that evidence for the prevention of migraine is limited in both quality and quantity.

Subsequently, in 2015, NICE approved the use of TMS for the treatment of depression in the UK and IPG542 replaced IPG242. NICE said "The evidence on repetitive transcranial magnetic stimulation for depression shows no major safety concerns. The evidence on its efficacy in the short-term is adequate, although the clinical response is variable. Repetitive transcranial magnetic stimulation for depression may be used with normal arrangements for clinical governance and audit."

United States: commercial health insurance 
In 2013, several commercial health insurance plans in the United States, including Anthem, Health Net, and Blue Cross Blue Shield of Nebraska and of Rhode Island, covered TMS for the treatment of depression for the first time.  In contrast, UnitedHealthcare issued a medical policy for TMS in 2013 that stated there is insufficient evidence that the procedure is beneficial for health outcomes in patients with depression.  UnitedHealthcare noted that methodological concerns raised about the scientific evidence studying TMS for depression include small sample size, lack of a validated sham comparison in randomized controlled studies, and variable uses of outcome measures. Other commercial insurance plans whose 2013 medical coverage policies stated that the role of TMS in the treatment of depression and other disorders had not been clearly established or remained investigational included Aetna, Cigna and Regence.

United States: Medicare 
Policies for Medicare coverage vary among local jurisdictions within the Medicare system, and Medicare coverage for TMS has varied among jurisdictions and with time.  For example:
 In early 2012 in New England, Medicare covered TMS for the first time in the United States.  However, that jurisdiction later decided to end coverage after October, 2013.
 In August 2012, the jurisdiction covering Arkansas, Louisiana, Mississippi, Colorado, Texas, Oklahoma, and New Mexico determined that there was insufficient evidence to cover the treatment, but the same jurisdiction subsequently determined that Medicare would cover TMS for the treatment of depression after December 2013.
 Subsequently, some other Medicare jurisdictions added Medicare coverage for depression.

Providers 
Manufacturers of TMS devices include Brainsway, Deymed , MagVenture , Mag&More , Magstim, Magnus Medical , Nexstim , Neuronetics, Neurosoft , Sebers Medical  and Actipulse Neuroscience [8]

See also 

 Cortical stimulation mapping
 Cranial electrotherapy stimulation
 Electrical brain stimulation
 Electroconvulsive therapy
 Low field magnetic stimulation
 Non-invasive cerebellar stimulation
 Transcranial alternating current stimulation
 Transcranial direct-current stimulation
 Transcranial random noise stimulation
 Vagus nerve stimulation

References 

Diagnostic neurology
Physical psychiatric treatments
Electrotherapy
Magnetic devices
Neurophysiology
Neuropsychology
Neurotechnology
Treatment of bipolar disorder
Treatment of depression
Medical devices
1985 introductions
2008 introductions
Bioelectromagnetics